Xie Jieshi (also transliterated as Hsieh Kai-shek; ; Hepburn: Sha Kaiseki; 1878 – 1954) was a cabinet minister in the Japanese-dominated Empire of Manchukuo, who served as Minister of Foreign Affairs.

Biography
Xie Jishi was born in Hsinchu, Qing Empire in 1878, and attended the Japanese-run Shinchiku Kokugo Denshujo, where he studied the Japanese language. He served as interpreter for Japanese Prime Minister Itō Hirobumi on his visit to Taiwan, by then under Japanese rule. Itō was so impressed with the young Xie that he recommended him for a scholarship to Meiji University in Tokyo, from which  he graduated from the law school.

Following the Xinhai Revolution, Xie travelled to China in 1913 and served as secretary-general to General Zhang Xun in Tianjin in 1913. He renounced his Japanese citizenship for citizenship in the Republic of China in 1915. He participated in Zhang Xun's brief restoration to power of the dethroned Emperor Puyi in 1917, and was Assistant Officer for Foreign Affairs during the brief imperial government. After Puyi was again deposed, Xie remained a strong supporter for the restoration of the Qing dynasty, and accompanied Puyi in exile from the Forbidden City in Beijing to the foreign concession in Tianjin in 1927.

Xie was later recruited by the warlord of Kirin Province, General Xi Qia, and assisted him in his negotiations with the Imperial Japanese Army after the Manchurian Incident, during which time Xi Qia declared Kirin Province independent from the Kuomintang government of the Republic of China.

After the state of Manchukuo was established, Xie became first Minister of Foreign Affairs. He assisted in the efforts to convince General Ma Zhanshan to support the new government. Through his efforts, many Taiwanese emigrated from Taiwan to Manchukuo in the 1930s. He was assigned as ambassador plenipotentiary to Japan on 19 June 1935. and helped organize the 1935 Taiwan Expo. He returned to Manchukuo in 1937 to assume the position of Minister of Industry. He shortly left government service for the private sector. After the fall of Manchukuo in 1945, Xie was arrested by the ROC government as a Japanese collaborator and traitor, and taken into custody until his release in 1948. He later died in Beijing in 1954.

References

1870s births
1954 deaths
Government ministers of Manchukuo
Taiwanese politicians
Diplomats of Manchukuo
Chinese collaborators with Imperial Japan
People from Hsinchu
Prisoners and detainees of China
Prisoners who died in Chinese detention
Meiji University alumni